The Cioccolato di Modica (Modica Chocolate or "Chocolate of Modica", also known as cioccolata modicana) is an Italian P.G.I. specialty chocolate, typical of the municipality of Modica in Sicily, characterized by an ancient and original recipe using manual grinding (rather than conching) which gives the chocolate a peculiar grainy texture and aromatic flavor.

History and characteristics 
The specialty was introduced in the County of Modica by the Spaniards, during their domination in southern Italy. The Spaniards probably learned from the Aztecs the technique of processing cocoa beans through the use of metate; however, Modica chocolate uses sugar in addition to cocoa, an ingredient which would have been unavailable to the Aztecs.

Stone ground chocolate, made by cold grinding cocoa beans and then adding sugar, is also made in Mexico today for use as drinking chocolate. It is typically sold in a variety of shapes, and also called "table chocolate." Well known brands include Ibarra (chocolate) and Mayordomo, or in the United States inspired by this style Taza Chocolate.

Modica chocolate is cold processed and has no cocoa butter added, at 45 degrees Celsius and without conching process sugar does not dissolve; that's why it has a different texture. According to the age old Modica cold working process all the beneficial properties of cocoa are kept intact.

Modica chocolate often has a white patina and tends to crumble. The cocoa butter blooming alters the traditional organoleptic properties of the product.

Since 2009 a festival named "Chocobarocco" is held every year in the city.

See also

 Italian cuisine
 
 Types of chocolate

References

Further reading

External links

 Modicachocolate.com
 Cioccolato di Modica IGP
 Modicacioccolato.it
 Cioccolatomodica.it

Cuisine of Sicily
Province of Ragusa
Italian chocolate
Modica
Italian products with protected designation of origin